Crataegus laevigata, known as the Midland hawthorn, English hawthorn, woodland hawthorn, or mayflower, is a species of hawthorn native to western and central Europe, from Great Britain (where it is typically found in ancient woodland and old hedgerows) and Spain east to the Czech Republic and Hungary. It is also present in North Africa. The species name is sometimes spelt C. levigata, but the original orthography is  C. lævigata.

Description
The hermaphrodite flowers are produced in corymbs of 6 to 12, each flower with five white or pale pink petals and two or sometimes three styles. The flowers are pollinated by insects. The fruit is a dark red pome  diameter, slightly broader than long, containing two or three nutlets.

It is distinguished from the closely related common hawthorn, C. monogyna, in the leaves being only shallowly lobed, with forward-pointing lobes, and in the flowers having more than one style.  Each style produces a seed, so its fruits also have more than one seed and these make them slightly oval, in contrast with the single-seeded and therefore round fruits of common hawthorn. The two species hybridise, giving rise to C. × media.

Taxonomy
In the past, Midland hawthorn was widely but incorrectly known by the name C. oxyacantha, a name that has now been rejected as being of uncertain application. In 1753, Linnaeus introduced the name C. oxyacantha for the single species of which he was aware, but described it in such a way that the name became used for various species, including both the Midland and the common hawthorn. In 1775, Jacquin formally separated the common hawthorn, naming it C. monogyna, and in 1946, Dandy showed that Linnaeus had actually observed a different plant,  C. oxyacantha. By this time, though, confusion over the true identity of C. oxyacantha was so great that Byatt proposed that the name should be formally rejected as ambiguous, and this proposal was accepted by the International Botanical Congress, although the name continues to be used informally.

The Midland hawthorn was described botanically as a separate species as long ago as 1798 by Poiret, whose name Mespilus laevigata referred to this hawthorn. Poiret's name is reflected in the revised formal botanical name of Midland hawthorn: Crataegus laevigata (Poir.) DC.

Cultivars
'François Rigaud' has yellow fruit.

'Paul's Scarlet'<ref>{{cite web|title=RHS Plant Selector - Crataegus laevigata 'Paul's Scarlet' | url=https://www.rhs.org.uk/Plants/93812/Crataegus-laevigata-Paul-s-Scarlet-(d)/Details | accessdate=15 April 2020}}</ref> (double red flowers), 'Punicea' (pink and white) and 'Rosea Flore Pleno' (double pink flowers) have gained the Royal Horticultural Society's Award of Garden Merit. These cultivars are considered by taxonomists to be derived from hybrids between C. laevigata and C. monogyna, within the named hybrid species C. × media.

Parasites
The hawthorn button-top gall on Midland hawthorn is caused by the dipteran gall-midge Dasineura crataegi.

References

Further reading
Flora Europaea: Crataegus
Bean, W. J. (1976). Trees and Shrubs Hardy in the British Isles, eighth edition, revised. John Murray.
UCConn Plant Database — copyright Mark Brand''.

laevigata
Trees of Europe
Flora of the Czech Republic
Flora of Germany
Flora of Hungary
Flora of Italy
Flora of Ukraine
Garden plants of Europe
Ornamental trees